The Saint Petersburg is a four-star hotel in Saint Petersburg, Russia.  It was constructed in 1970 under the name Hotel Leningrad.

The hotel has 554 rooms and a concert hall with a capacity of 797 people. It also contains an exhibition area and three conference halls.

History 
In 1967, the Hotel Leningrad started construction. The architects were S.B. Speransky, V.E. Struzman and N.V. Kamensky.  The original plan was to build the hotel in two stages.  The second stage, never completed, was to construct a 13-story building in the form of an open-ring with an inner courtyard with a swimming pool and fountains.

Opening in 1970, the hotel was the first large hotel in the area since before World War II. During its first ten years, the hotel received more than a million foreign guests.  The hotel was the first in the Soviet Union to offer buffet-breakfast and Continental breakfast.

In 1986, the second part of the match for the world chess championship between Garry Kasparov and Anatoliy Karpov was held in the hotel.

On February 23, 1991, a fire consumed the seventh, eighth and ninth floors of the hotel, killing seven guests and nine firefighters. A monument to the firefighters is located near the Kalinsky district fire station.

In 2006 the second meeting of G8 ministers of finance was held in the hotel.

Facilities 
The hotel has several restaurants and bars  One restaurant has a brewery and bakery where live music performances are held almost daily.

The second floor of the hotel contained a winter garden with views of the historical part of the city. A two-story restaurant is located in a glass cylinder structure known as the "Mirror fort"  The hotel had an exchange bar, a rarity for Russia of the 1970s.

Every year dozens of scientific congresses, symposiums, and concerts are held in the hotel.

External links
 official website

References 

Hotels in Saint Petersburg